The Austria men's national water polo team is the representative for Austria in international men's water polo.

Results

Olympic Games
1912 — 4th place
1936 — 6th place
1952 — 13th place

References

Water polo
Men's national water polo teams
National water polo teams in Europe
National water polo teams by country
 
Men's sport in Austria